Aruro is the biggest island in Lake Abaya, which is in Ethiopia. Aruro is administratively part of Boreda Abaya, a woreda of the Gamo Gofa Zone.

Lake islands of Ethiopia
Southern Nations, Nationalities, and Peoples' Region